"Love in the Shadows" is an uptempo pop song written and recorded by Neil Sedaka. The song became an international Top 20 hit in 1976.

The song reached number 16 on the U.S. Billboard Hot 100 and spent two weeks at number 4 on the Adult Contemporary chart.

The song was also a hit in Canada, charting quite closely to its U.S. peaks on both the Pop Singles chart (#18 for two weeks) as well as the Adult Contemporary chart (#6).

Chicago radio superstation WLS, which gave the song much airplay, ranked "Love in the Shadows" as the 88th most popular hit of 1976.
It reached as high as #8 on their survey of June 26, 1976.

Chart performance

Weekly charts

Year-end charts

References

1976 songs
1976 singles
Neil Sedaka songs
Songs written by Neil Sedaka
Songs with lyrics by Phil Cody
The Rocket Record Company singles